Guruvayankere is a village in Beltangadi Taluk of Dakshina Kannada district in the country of India. It is located en route to Udupi from Beltangadi. This village is located at a distance of 58 km from Mangalore city.

External links 
  Map of Beltangadi taluk

Villages in Dakshina Kannada district